SM UB-50 was a German Type UB III submarine or U-boat in the German Imperial Navy during World War I. The U-boat was ordered on 20 May 1916. She was commissioned into the Pola Flotilla of the German Imperial Navy on 12 July 1917 as SM UB-50.

She operated as part of the Pola Flotilla based in Cattaro. UB-50 surrendered on 16 January 1919 with the remainder of the Pola Flotilla following an order by Admiral Reinhard Scheer to return to port. During her passage through the Straits of Gibraltar, she managed to sink the battleship . UB-50 was later broken up at Swansea.

Construction

UB-50 was ordered by the German Imperial Navy on 20 May 1916. She was built by Blohm & Voss, Hamburg and following just under a year of construction, launched at Hamburg on 6 January 1917. UB-50 was commissioned later that same year under the command of  Kapitänleutnant (Kptlt.) Franz Becker. Like all Type UB III submarines, UB-50 carried 10 torpedoes and was armed with an  SK L/30 deck gun. UB-50 had a displacement of  while surfaced and  when submerged. Her engines enabled her to travel at  when surfaced and  when submerged.

Service history

First patrol
Soon after she left Pola, UB-50 encountered the William H. Crawford, a  American sailing ship. It sank after an attack from the U-boat stopped her. Four days later, UB-50 sighted the  British barge R.B.40. UB 50 launched a torpedo which instead hit the British tug towing the ship, the  H.s.3. The tug sank, but the barge was not sunk. Four days later, UB-50 finally encountered and sank a merchant, this being the  British Polar Prince, carrying coal for Malta. Two days later, she sank the Fabian, a  British steamer going to Liverpool, killing three. Later that day, she sank the Gioffredo Mameli, a  ton Italian steamer carrying ore. The  coal carrying Greek steamer Alkyon was attacked two days later by UB-50, sinking close off Oran. The UB 50 followed up with the sinking of the  Norwegian steamer John Knudsen, killing one. Four days later, the  Italian sailboat Ciro was scuttled after being hit by UB-50, the last ship she would sink before returning to base.

Second patrol
SM UB-50 began her second patrol with the sinking of the Marc Fraissinet, a  French steamer carrying wood, munitions, and hay to Bizerte. Later that day UB 50 encountered the Senegal, an  Italian steamer, sinking her off the coast of Algeria with no casualties. Three days after that, the Margram Abbey, a  British steamer carrying coal, was found and torpedoed by UB-50. It was beached off the coast of Algeria, but the torpedo damage, which killed two, had wrecked the ship. UB 50 attacked the Antaeus, a  British steamer, three days later off Cape Bon. There were no casualties, but the captain was taken prisoner. On the following day, UB 50 torpedoed the Amberton, a  British steamer, but she was only damaged. Four days later, the submarine found her last target of her second patrol, the  American steamer Rizal, which sank  from Cape Cavallo.

Third patrol
UB-50 started out her third patrol by finding and sinking the  Italian sailboat S. Giuseppe B. off the coast of Africa. On Christmas Day, 1917, UB-50 sank the Sant’ Antonio, an  Italian sailing vessel, by gunfire near Bizerte. On New Year's Day, 1918, the Egyptian Transport, a  British steamer, was damaged during an attack by UB-50, which killed five men. It was later beached but refloated. Two days later, the Allanton, a  British steamer carrying coal, was sunk by UB-50, which also sunk the Steelville, a  British steamer also carrying coal later that day. Four days later, UB-50 torpedoed the Arab, a  British steamer coal off the coast of Cape Serrat, killing 21.

Fourth patrol
UB-50s fourth patrol was very successful. In less than a month, she sank six vessels. The first victim was the  French steamer Saint Jean Ii, which went down 22 March 1918 off Cap Bon. That same day, UB-50 managed to damage the British steamer Shadwell off Bizerta. Four days later UB-50 sank the  Italian steamer Volturno off Bone (Annaba), Algeria. On 6 April, UB-50 sank the French vessel Madeleine Iii and on 11 April, she sank the Italian sailing ship Carmela G and the British vessel Highland Prince.

Fifth patrol
UB-50 began her fifth war patrol by damaging the  British steamer Elswick Grange carrying coal off the coast of Oran, killing one. Two days later, she ran across the  British steamer Mavisbrook carrying coal. She was torpedoed south east of Cabo de Gata, killing 18. On that same day, she came upon the  Danish three-masted iron-hulled schooner Kirstine Jesen, sinking after being fired upon from UB-50's deck gun with no deaths. Two days later, the New Sweden, a  Swedish steamer, was hit by UB-50 and sank. Two days later, UB-50 found the  Spanish steamer Maria Pia, which sank with no casualties. Three days after that, the  French sailboat Animal Lafont and  Italian sailboat Santa Teresa were torpedoed by the U-boat with no casualties.

Sixth patrol
Shortly before her sixth patrol, Oberleutnant zur See Heinrich Kukat took over command from Kptlt. Becker. On her sixth patrol, UB-50 encountered the Imber, a  British steamer and torpedoed her south of Cape St. Maria di Leuca, though she survived. Three days later, UB-50 sank the War Swallow, a  British merchant ship carrying coal from the River Tyne to Port Said. Another three days passed before UB-50 found her next target, the Italian steamer Adria 1, a ship carrying cotton from Palermo to Tunis. It sank, but there were no deaths. Two days later, the  British steamer Upada was torpedoed by UB-50 killing three, but was only damaged. UB-50 sank the Messidor, a  British coal steamer two days later, sinking the ship and killing one. The following day, she torpedoed the Rutherglen, a  British steam merchant carrying coal. That was followed by an attack on the Magellan, a  British steamer on the following day. She sank with one man. The last ship sunk on the patrol was the Antonio S., a  Italian sailboat sunk off the coast of Tunisia.

Seventh patrol

On 9 November 1918, two days before the Armistice with Germany, UB-50 sank the British battleship HMS Britannia. The Britannia was on a voyage to Gibraltar when she was torpedoed off Cape Trafalgar. After the initial explosion, the ship began listing ten degrees to port. A few minutes later, another explosion started a fire in a  magazine, which resulted in a cordite explosion in the magazine. The Britannia stayed at 10-degrees for 2½ hours before sinking.  Its 16,350-tons made it the largest ship the U-boat ever sank, and the only one UB-50 would sink during her last patrol.

Summary of raiding history

References

Notes

Citations

Bibliography

 
 

German Type UB III submarines
World War I submarines of Germany
U-boats commissioned in 1917
1917 ships
Ships built in Hamburg